Hisn Murad or Murad is a small coastal fishing village in the Lahij Governorate of the Bab-el-Mandeb in the south-western tip of Yemen overlooking the Gulf of Aden. It lies on the border of the Lahij Governorate and the Ta'izz Governorate. The island of Perim lies just off the coast. It is connected by road to Dhubab and Mocha in the north and As Suqayyan, Al Bahiyah, Am Juhar and Aden in the east.

References

Populated places in Lahij Governorate
Populated coastal places in Yemen